The Frederick C. Robie House is a U.S. National Historic Landmark now on the campus of the University of Chicago in the South Side neighborhood of Hyde Park in Chicago, Illinois. Built between 1909 and 1910, the building was designed as a single family home by architect Frank Lloyd Wright. It is considered perhaps the finest example of Prairie School, the first architectural style considered uniquely American.

Robie House was designated a National Historic Landmark on November 27, 1963, and was on the first National Register of Historic Places list of October 15, 1966. The house and a selection of seven other properties by Wright were inscribed on the World Heritage List under the title "The 20th-Century Architecture of Frank Lloyd Wright" in July 2019.

History
Wright designed the Robie House in his studio in Oak Park, Illinois between 1908 and 1909. The design precedent for the Robie House was the Ferdinand F. Tomek House in Riverside, Illinois, designed by Wright in 1907–08. At the time that he commissioned Wright to design his home, Robie was only 28 years old and the assistant manager of the Excelsior Supply Company, a company on the South Side of Chicago owned and managed by his father. Although later drawings of the Robie House show a date of 1906, Wright could not have started the design for the building earlier than the spring of 1908 because Robie had actually purchased the property only in May of that year. He and his wife, Lora Hieronymus Robie, a 1900 graduate of the University of Chicago, had selected the property at 5757 South Woodlawn Avenue in order to remain close to the campus and the social life of the university.

The contractor for the project, H.B. Barnard Co. of Chicago, began construction on April 15, 1909. Wright did not supervise the construction of the house except in the earliest stages. He closed his Oak Park studio in the fall of 1909 and left for Europe to undertake the work which led to the publication of the Wasmuth Portfolio. He turned over his existing commissions to Hermann von Holst, who retained Marion Mahony, a draughtswoman in Wright's office, and George Mann Niedecken, an interior designer from Milwaukee, Wisconsin who had worked with Wright on the Susan Lawrence Dana House in Springfield, Illinois, the Avery Coonley House in Riverside, Illinois, and the Meyer May House in Grand Rapids, Michigan, to continue their work on the project. Niedecken's influence can be seen in the design of some of the furnishings for the house as well as the carpets in the entrance hall, the living room, and the dining room.

The Robie family—Frederick, Laura, and their two children, Frederick Jr. and Lorraine—moved into the home in May 1910, although all of the final details, including rugs and furniture, were not completed until January 1911. The final cost of the home was $58,500--$13,500 for the land, $35,000 for the design and construction of the building, and $10,000 for the furnishings. (Simple inflation adjusted equivalents of $58,500 in 1910 hover around $1.5 million in 2015, although other ways of comparing price and value over time could place that figure as high as $10 million without accounting for any potential premium as a result of the historical fame of the house.) Robie's original budget had been $60,000.

Robie's tenure in his home was short lived, however. As a result of financial problems incurred by the death of his father in July 1908, who was plagued by gambling debts that Robie unknowingly inherited (allegedly totaling roughly $1 million, or the equivalent of $27 million today), and the deterioration of his marriage, Robie was forced to sell the house after living in it for only fourteen months. David Lee Taylor, president of Taylor-Critchfield Company, an advertising agency, bought the house and all of its Wright-designed contents in December 1911. Taylor died less than a year later, and his widow, Ellen Taylor, sold the house and most of its contents to Marshall D. Wilber, treasurer of the Wilber Mercantile Agency, in November 1912. The Wilbers were the last family to live in Robie House, living there for fourteen years.

In June 1926, the Wilbers sold the house and its contents to the Chicago Theological Seminary, who used the house as a dormitory and dining hall although it was primarily interested in the site for purposes of future expansion. Consequently, Robie House suffered major interior damage, including the destruction of nearly all the characteristic gold wall sconces. Furthermore, at the time, a janitor discovered Wright's handcrafted rocking chair discarded in a trash heap and saved it. Years later, the janitor contacted the University of Chicago when the museum opened up and regifted the chair to Robie House, where it is currently on display in one of the bedrooms. In 1941, a graduate student at the Illinois Institute of Technology accidentally discovered that the Seminary was moving ahead with a plan to demolish the Robie House and informed his instructors, including Ludwig Mies van der Rohe. The threat of demolition aroused a storm of protest. Although the Seminary's plans were subsequently postponed, the crisis was averted more by the onset of World War II than by acquiescence of the property's owner.

The most serious threat to the Robie House arose 16 years later. On March 1, 1957, the Seminary announced plans to demolish the Robie House on September 15 in order to begin the construction of a dormitory for its students. This time an international outcry arose, and Wright himself, then almost 90 years old, returned to the Robie House on March 18, accompanied by the media, students and neighborhood organizers to protest the intended demolition of the house. Commenting on the threatened demolition, Wright quipped, "It all goes to show the danger of entrusting anything spiritual to the clergy." Two fraternities at the University of Chicago provided the Seminary with a realistic alternative to its plans of demolition. During his very brief tenure as a student at the University of Wisconsin, Wright had been a member of the Phi Delta Theta fraternity. The University of Chicago's Phi Delt chapter house was located two doors north of the Robie house at 5737 Woodlawn Avenue, and the Seminary was already the owner of the lot between the two properties. The Phi Delts offered to vacate their house, and the Zeta Beta Tau fraternity, located next to the Phi Delt house, offered to vacate their house as well. These offers were a turning point in the effort to save the Robie house since the three properties provided the Seminary with sufficient land for the dormitory they sought to build.

In August 1958, William Zeckendorf, a friend of Wright's and a New York real estate developer then involved in several development projects on Chicago's south side, acquired the Robie House at Wright's urging from the seminary through his development company Webb & Knapp. In February 1963, Zeckendorf donated the building to the University of Chicago. The University used Robie House as the Adlai E. Stevenson Institute of International Affairs, and later the building served as the headquarters for the University's Alumni Association. On September 15, 1971, the Commission on Chicago Landmarks, with the support of Mayor Richard J. Daley, declared the Robie House a Chicago landmark.

In January 1997 the University moved their offices out and turned over tours, operations, fundraising and restoration to the Frank Lloyd Wright Trust on February 1. In 2002, the Frank Lloyd Wright Trust began restoration of the Robie House to its original appearance in 1910, when construction completed and the house best reflected the design intent of the architect and the client. Harboe Architects, a leading firm in historic preservation, conducted an assessment, prepared plans for restoration, and led the interior restoration. The Trust follows guidelines developed by the Secretary of the Interior's Standards for the Treatment of Historic Properties. The restoration was completed in 2019, costing over 11 million dollars. After major structural steel restoration, exterior brick work, and installation of modern mechanical systems, the restoration focused on the interiors elements, such as woodwork, glass, and furniture.
The Robie House is really popular and has many knockoffs built. One built in Chicago's Edgebrook neighborhood recently went on sale and attracted 6 buyers in its first day on the market.

Architecture

The Robie House is one of the best known examples of Frank Lloyd Wright's Prairie style of architecture. The term was coined by architectural critics and historians (not by Wright) who noticed how the buildings and their various components owed their design influence to the landscape and plant life of the midwest prairie of the United States. Typical of Wright's Prairie houses, he designed not only the house, but all of the interiors, the windows, lighting, rugs, furniture and textiles. As Wright wrote in 1910, "it is quite impossible to consider the building one thing and its furnishings another.  ... They are all mere structural details of its character and completeness."

Exterior
The projecting cantilevered roof eaves, continuous bands of art-glass windows, and the use of Roman brick emphasize the horizontal, which had rich associations for Wright. The horizontal line reminded him of the American prairie and was a line of repose and shelter, appropriate for a house.
The exterior walls are double-wythe construction of a Chicago common brick core with a red-orange iron-spotted Roman brick veneer. To further emphasize the horizontal of the bricks, the horizontal joints were filled with a cream-colored mortar and the small vertical joints were filled with brick-colored mortar. From a distance, this complex and expensive tuckpointing creates an impression of continuous lines of horizontal color and minimizes the appearance of individual bricks.
The design of the art glass windows is an abstract pattern of colored and clear glass using Wright's favorite 30 and 60-degree angles. Wright used similar designs in tapestries inside the house and for gates surrounding the outdoor spaces and enclosing the garage courtyard. 
Robie's generous budget allowed Wright to design a house with a largely steel structure, which accounts for the minimal deflection of the eaves.
The planter urns, copings, lintels, sills and other exterior trimwork are of Bedford limestone.

Interior

In plan, the house is designed as two large rectangles that seem to slide by one another. Mr. Wright referred to the rectangle on the southwest portion of the site, which contains the principal living spaces of the house, as "the major vessel." On the first floor are the "billiards" room (west end) and children's playroom (east end). The billiards room provided access to a large walk-in safe and a storage area built underneath the front porch projection at the west end of the site. The billiards and playroom open into a small passage and doors near the center of the building to an enclosed garden on the south side of the building. Another door from the playroom opens into the courtyard on the east end of the site. On the second floor are the entry hall at the top of the central stairway, the living room (west end) and the dining room (east end). Built-in inglenook bench cabinetry originally separated the entry hallway from the living room. The living and dining rooms flow into one another along the south side of the building and open through a series of twelve French doors containing art glass panels to an exterior balcony running the length of the south side of the building that overlooks the enclosed garden. The west end of the living room contains a "prow" with art glass windows and two art glass doors that open onto the west porch beneath the cantilevered roof. Wright intended that the users of the building move freely from the interior space to the exterior space.

The rectangle on the northeast portion of the site, called "the minor vessel," contains the more functional and service-related rooms of the house. On the first floor is the main door and entrance hall (west end) from which a stairway leads to the second floor living and dining rooms. A half bath is located on the north side of the entrance hall. Further east are a coat closet and back stairway, the boiler room, laundry room, and coal storage room, followed by a small workshop, half bath, and a three-car garage. The westernmost bay of the garage originally contained a mechanic's pit, and the easternmost bay contained equipment to wash and clean automobiles. On the second floor of the minor vessel is a guest bedroom above the entrance hall and an adjoining full bath. East of the back stairway are the kitchen and butler's pantry, and the servants' sitting room. Two bedrooms and a full bathroom above the garage complete the quarters for the live-in servants.

The third floor overlaps the major and minor vessels in the center of the building. Wright referred to the third floor as the "belvedere," the "place in command of beautiful views." The south side of the third floor contains the master bedroom, dressing area, a full bathroom, and, through a small closet and an art glass door, a balcony facing south and west. Two additional bedrooms and a full bathroom are located on the north side of this floor. All of the windows on this level contain art glass panels. Dresser drawers are built into the walls of the bedrooms underneath the windows, and project into the eave spaces.

The chimney mass containing four fireplaces—one in the billiards room, playroom, living room and master bedroom—and the main stairway from the entrance hall to the second floor living and dining rooms rise through the center of the house, from which the rest of the building radiates. The chimney mass is constructed of the same brick and limestone as the exterior.

The front door and main entrance is partially hidden on the northwest side of the building beneath an overhanging balcony in order to create a sense of privacy and protection for the family. The entrance hall itself is low-ceilinged and dark, but the stairs to the second floor create a sense of anticipation as the visitor moves upward. Once upstairs, the light filled living and dining rooms create a sharp contrast to the dark entrance hall making the living and dining rooms seem even more special. These two rooms are separated by the central chimney mass, but the spaces are connected along their south sides, and the chimney mass has an opening above the fireplace through which the rooms are visually connected. These features unite the two spaces, creating an openness of plan which, for Wright, was a metaphor for the openness of American political and social life.

As with all Prairie houses, Wright designed the light fixtures for the Robie House. Throughout the house, wall sconces can be found in the shape of a hemispherical shade suspended beneath a square bronze fixture. On the second floor living and dining rooms, spherical globes within wooden squares are integrated into the ceiling trim, further tying the two spaces together visually. Soffit lighting running the length of the north and south sides of the living and dining rooms, as well as soffit lighting in the prows of the living and dining rooms, are covered with Wright-designed wooden grilles, backed with translucent colored glass diffusers. Because these lights are all independently operable, different effects can be created within these spaces. Finally, a Wright-designed table lamp with an art glass shade stood on a Wright-designed library table in the living room.

The steel beams in the ceilings and floors carry most of the building's weight to piers at the east and west ends. As a result, the exterior walls have little structural function, and thus are filled with doors and windows containing 174 art glass panels in 29 different designs. Instead of stylized forms from Nature, a favorite Wright motif, geometric forms predominate. The combination of so much glass and lack of internal structural columns resulted in an airy space that appeared larger than it is, accenting the open plan Wright favored.

Wright also designed the furniture, carpets, and textiles for most Prairie houses. However, Wright-designed furniture in the Robie House was only constructed for the entrance hall, the living and dining rooms, guest bedroom, and one bed for the third-floor bedrooms. Some of these pieces are attributed to Wright's interior design collaborator George Mann Niedecken. Robie's financial situation following his father's death may be the explanation for why the entire house was not furnished with furniture of Wright's designs. Most of the original furniture is currently in the collection of the Smart Museum of Art at the University of Chicago, although only the dining room table and chairs are on more or less permanent display. One of the most striking pieces of the furniture designed by Wright for the Robie House is a sofa with extended armrests, echoing the cantilevers of the exterior roof of the building, which effectively create side tables on each side of the sofa. The Wright-designed sofa has been on loan since 1982 from the Smart Museum to the Metropolitan Museum of Art in New York and is on display as part of the furnishings in the reconstructed living room of the Francis W. Little House (1915) located in the museum. Miniature cantilevers can also be found in the shelves of the built-in dining room buffet and a food preparation island in the kitchen.

Architectural significance

The Robie House was one of the last houses Wright designed in his Oak Park, Illinois home and studio and also one of the last of his Prairie School houses. According to the Historical American Buildings Survey, the city of Chicago's Commission on Chicago Architectural Landmarks stated: "The bold interplay of horizontal planes about the chimney mass, and the structurally expressive piers and windows, established a new form of domestic design." Because the house's components are so well designed and coordinated, it is considered to be a quintessential example of Wright's Prairie School architecture and the "measuring stick" against which all other Prairie School buildings are compared.

The house and the Robie name were immortalized in Ernst Wasmuth's famous 1910 publication Ausgefuhrte Bauten und Entwurfe von Frank Lloyd Wright (Completed Buildings and Projects of Frank Lloyd Wright, a.k.a. "The Wasmuth Portfolio"). This publication featured most of Wright's designs, including those unbuilt, during his Oak Park years and brought them to the attention of students of the Bauhaus school in Germany and the De Stijl school in the Netherlands. Ludwig Mies van der Rohe among other great 20th Century architects, claimed Wright was a major influence on their careers. Mies van der Rohe later visited the Robie House and Wright's home (Taliesin) in Spring Green, WI.

The architectural significance of the Robie House was probably best stated in a 1957 article in House and Home magazine:

During the decades of eclecticism's triumph there were also many innovators—less heralded than the fashionable practitioners, but exerting more lasting influence. Of these innovators, none could rival Frank Lloyd Wright. By any standard his Robie house was the House of the 1900s—indeed the House of the Century.

Above all else, the Robie House is a magnificent work of art. But, in addition, the house introduced so many concepts in planning and construction that its full influence cannot be measured accurately for many years to come. Without this house, much of modern architecture as we know it today, might not exist.

In 1956, The Archectural Record selected the Robie House as "one of the seven most notable residences ever built in America."

In 1991, the American Institute of Architects named Robie House among the Top All-Time Work of American Architects.

In 2008, the U.S. National Park Service submitted the Robie house, along with nine other Frank Lloyd Wright properties, to a tentative list for World Heritage Status. The 10 sites have been submitted as one entire site. More recently, in July 2012, the Secretary of the Interior Ken Salazar announced that he would formally nominate the Robie House and ten other Wright designed buildings as U.S. nominations for World Heritage status. The final decision on inclusion on the list will be made by the World Heritage Committee, composed of representatives from 21 nations and advised by the International Council on Monuments and Sites. After revised proposals, the properties were inscribed on the World Heritage List under the title "The 20th-Century Architecture of Frank Lloyd Wright" in July 2019.

In 2011, Lego released a 2276-piece model set of the Robie House under its Lego Architecture line of products (set number 21010). It was the third Wright building to be featured in the series.

Robie House is the subject of a 2013 PBS documentary and companion book, "10 Buildings that Changed America."

In celebration of the 2018 Illinois Bicentennial, the Robie House was selected as one of the Illinois 200 Great Places  by the American Institute of Architects Illinois component (AIA Illinois).

Neighborhood 
At the time Robie House was commissioned in 1908, the lots surrounding the house's site were mostly vacant except for the lots immediately to the north on Woodlawn Avenue, which were filled with large homes. To the east of the site and across a municipal service alley, a French Provincial style house for Nobel prize winning physicist Albert A. Michelson was built around 1923. The lots to the south were vacant and afforded uninterrupted views to the Midway Plaisance parkland, one of the sites of the World's Columbian Exposition. To the west, a full block of vacant land separated the site from the growing University of Chicago campus, but by 1930 Rockefeller Chapel (1928), the Chicago Theological Seminary (1928), and the Oriental Institute (1930) buildings had been constructed.

Directly south across 58th Street from Robie House is the Charles M. Harper Center of the University of Chicago Booth School of Business. Designed by the Uruguayan-born architect Rafael Viñoly and completed in 2004, the building both respects the scale of the Robie House and contains elements that echo Wright's contributions to the vocabulary of modern architecture.

Gallery

See also
 List of Frank Lloyd Wright works
 Storrer, William Allin. The Frank Lloyd Wright Companion. University Of Chicago Press, 2006,  (S.127)

Notes

External links

 Frank Lloyd Wright Preservation Trust: Robie House
 Drawings, photos and data pages in the Library of Congress Historic American Buildings Survey
 Pictures of Robie House
High-resolution 360° Panoramas and Images of Frederick C. Robie House | Art Atlas
Illinois Great Places - Robie House
Society of Architectural Historians SAH ARCHIPEDIA entry on Robie House
Computer rendition of Robie House by Razin Khan.

Frank Lloyd Wright buildings
Prow houses
Historic house museums in Illinois
Houses completed in 1910
Houses on the National Register of Historic Places in Chicago
Hyde Park, Chicago
Museums in Chicago
National Historic Landmarks in Chicago
University of Chicago
1910 establishments in Illinois
Chicago Landmarks